Kakihara (written: 垣原 or 柿原) is a Japanese surname. Notable people with the surname include:

, Japanese ice hockey player
, Japanese professional wrestler
, Japanese ice hockey player
, Japanese voice actor and singer

Fictional characters
Masao Kakihara, a character in the manga series Ichi the Killer

Japanese-language surnames